Bi Bakran (also Romanized as Bī Bakrān and Bībakrān; also known as Bibikeran, Būbakrān, and Būnkarān) is a village in Margavar Rural District, Silvaneh District, Urmia County, West Azerbaijan Province, Iran. At the 2006 census, its population was 214, in 35 families.

References 

Populated places in Urmia County